Cymothoe adela, the Sierra Leone yellow glider, is a butterfly in the family Nymphalidae. It is found in Guinea and Sierra Leone. The habitat consists of forests.

References

Butterflies described in 1890
Cymothoe (butterfly)
Butterflies of Africa